Jillian Marie Gilchrest (born March 21, 1982) is an American politician who is a member of the Connecticut House of Representatives from the 18th district in Hartford County.

Early life

She earned a Masters Degree in Social Work at the University of Connecticut School of Social Work.

Career

Gilchrest served as the Director of Health Professional Outreach for the Connecticut Coalition Against Domestic Violence, Executive Director of NARAL Pro-Choice Connecticut, and Director of Policy & Communications for the Connecticut Alliance to End Sexual Violence.

Political career

Gilchrest was elected to the West Hartford Board of Education in 2013.

2018 Election

2020 Election

2022 Election

Political views

Connecticut family medical leave act (CFMLA)
Glichrest voted in favor of the Connecticut family medical leave act signed into law one June 25, 2019 by Governor Ned Lamont. The bill passed the house on May 31, 2019, by a 79–69 vote. Connecticut will join California, Massachusetts, New Jersey, New York, Rhode Island, Washington and the District of Columbia in implementing a paid-family-leave insurance program. The bill provides employees with up to 12 weeks of paid leave in a 12-month period to care for themselves, family members—including a spouse, parents, in-laws, children, siblings, grandparents, and grandchildren—and anyone else whose close association, whether by blood or affinity, is the equivalent of a family member. Employees will fund the paid-family-leave program by contributing 0.5 percent of their income via a mandatory payroll tax, with contributions commencing in January 2021. Employers make no contributions toward the program. State government employees who belong to unions are exempt, a fact that did not go unnoticed by private business opponents to the bill.

Gun control
In 2020 Gilchrest proposed a bill H.B. 5040, which would require gun owners to pay a 35 percent ammunition tax. In the previous legislative session she proposed a 50 percent ammunition tax, that ended up being unsuccessful. The bill would use money raised from the ammunition tax to fund statewide gun violence prevention and intervention efforts.

Police accountability movement 2020
In July 2020 all three West Hartford representatives, Tammy Exum, Joe Verrengia and Gilchrest, voted in favor of the police accountability act passed by the Connecticut house of representatives. The bill includes a provision that would allow citizens to file civil lawsuits against police, eliminating the qualified immunity which protects officers from being sued in states courts.

Reproductive Freedom Defense Act

In 2022, Gilchrest cosponsored House Bill 5414, along with Rep. Matt Blumenthal, with whom she had cofounded the General Assembly's Reproductive Freedom Caucus that year. The bill, signed into law by Governor Ned Lamont shortly after passage as the  Reproductive Freedom Defense Act, was a response to the Texas Heartbeat Act and similar legislation passed in other states to restrict abortion access in anticipation of the Supreme Court's Dobbs v. Jackson Women's Health Organization decision, which overruled Roe v. Wade, and held that there is no constitutional right to abortion, allowing states to ban it outright, as several did in its immediate aftermath. It allows those who provide or facilitate the provision of abortions in Connecticut and are sued under laws like that in Texas to countersue in Connecticut for equivalent damages, prevents the state and its courts from assisting in the investigation or prosecutions of any abortions in other states that would be legal in Connecticut, or extraditing Connecticut residents charged in other states for such acts. It also expands abortion services available in Connecticut by allowing certain non-physicians to perform suction and medication abortions.

References

Connecticut Democrats
Gilchrest, Jillian
Living people
21st-century American politicians
21st-century American women politicians
Women state legislators in Connecticut
1982 births
University of Connecticut alumni